Hadj Sadok Bouziane (also known as El Hadj Seddouk Bouziane) (born October 4, 1987 in Sidi Lakhdar, Algeria) is an Algerian football player who is currently playing as a midfielder for ASO Chlef in the Algerian league.

Career
In 2005, he won a television sports reality show called "SoccaStars" (hosted by FutureTV) and was awarded with a one-year contract at the Newcastle United academy. He was chosen as the top player on the show out of 6,000 contestants from all the Arab countries, and also won a Toyota SUV. However, due to visa problems, he was unable to travel to England and did not join Newcastle United. Prior to the competition, he worked as a shepherd and said that he had never played organized football.

In 2007, he signed with ASO Chlef.

External links
 DZFoot.com Profile

References 

1987 births
Algerian footballers
Living people
ASO Chlef players
People from Aïn Defla Province
Association football midfielders
21st-century Algerian people